Burning at Both Ends is the third studio album by American pop punk band Set Your Goals. Recording for the album began in  October and November 2010 with producer Brian McTernan in Baltimore, Maryland. The group took a break to support You Me at Six on their UK tour in December; they were unable to fly back until the end of the month due to bad weather to finish the album. The sessions resumed and ran in to mid-January when the band ran out of studio time. They briefly tracked with second producer Mike Green in Los Angeles, California. Following recording, the band embarked on two US tours, one supporting Parkway Drive and the other alongside August Burns Red.

Leading up to the album's release announcement, "Start the Reactor" and "Exit Summer" were made available for streaming, and "Certain" served as the first single. Burning at Both Ends was released through independent label Epitaph Records in June 2011. A stint on the Warped Tour and performances at the Australian Soundwave Counter-Revolution festival followed. The band continued touring the US until the end of the year with two supporting slots for New Found Glory and Four Year Strong, and a separate headlining tour soon after. Shows in South America and festival appearances preceded a 2012 co-headlining US tour with Cartel and a UK tour. Following this, "Product of the " was released as a single in June.

Described as a melodic hardcore and pop punk record, Burning at Both Ends has a slower tempo than the group's previous albums. It peaked at number 165 on the Billboard 200 and charted on the Billboard component charts—Independent Albums and Top Rock Albums. Burning at Both Ends received a favourable response from critics, although some noted the lack of energy and tempo. Dead Press! included the album on a pop punk best-of list.

Background and recording
In March 2009, the band announced they had signed to independent label Epitaph Records, which had helped to free them from their contract with their previous label Eulogy Recordings. The group's second album, This Will Be the Death of Us, was released through Epitaph in July. It had some minor success, peaking at number 65 on the Billboard 200. On October 1, 2010, the group began recording with producer Brian McTernan at Salad Days Studios in Baltimore, Maryland. McTernan, who also acted as the engineer, was assisted in the production by Paul Leavitt. Going into the studio, the band had four to five versions of each track already worked out. During the sessions, McTernan wanted the group to write a hit; they subsequently jammed out "Certain" and "London Heathrow" in 30 minutes.

Recording continued in to November, before the group took a break to support You Me at Six on their headlining UK tour in December. While trying to fly home, the band were stuck at Heathrow Airport as all flights had been cancelled due to bad weather. They returned to Baltimore on December 29 and resumed recording the following day. Rhythm guitar and bass parts were finished, and half the vocals were done by January 5, 2011; lead guitar parts followed on January 8. The band left Baltimore on January 15 having run out of studio time. They began working with Mike Green in Los Angeles, California, on January 20 to finish up the vocals. These sessions were held at Tree Fort Studio; Green, who also served as the engineer, was assisted in production by Kyle Black.

On January 31, the group announced that they had finished recording. Three of the tracks featured additional vocal contributions: Black, Jenn Brown, Ryan Holden and Julio on "The Last American Virgin"; Matt Arcangeli on "Unconditional"; and Andrew Neufeld of Comeback Kid on "Illuminated Youth". In addition, throughout the album are crew vocals by: Brown, Holden, Julio, Arcangeli, Michael Bumblis, 1090 Club keyboardist Mike Galt, Emilio Martinez, Kevin O'Connell, Seahaven drummer James Phillips, Epitaph staff member Felicia Risolo, Brian Warner, and Set Your Goals. All the tracks except "Raphael" were mixed by JR McNeely at ELM Studio South in Nashville, Tennessee. "Raphael" was mixed by Black at Tree Fort. Dave Collins then mastered the tracks at DC Mastering in Los Angeles.

Composition
Musically, the album has been described as melodic hardcore and pop punk, with hardcore punk-inspired guitar work. It drew comparisons to early Saves the Day and Blink-182. Overall, the album has a slower tempo than the band's past releases, except for "Exit Summer" and "Illuminated Youth", both of which retain faster tempos. All the songs are credited to Set Your Goals and Brian McTernan, with the exception of "Calaveras", which was written by drummer Mikey Ambrose. Vocalists Matt Wilson and Jordan Brown wrote all of the lyrics. "Cure for Apathy" is about being able to discern the differences between fame and success. "Start the Reactor" tackles the aspect of home life and the issues that arise from being part of a full-time touring act. Lyrically, "Happy New Year" is the darkest track on the album; Wilson said 2010 was the "worst year of [his] life", and had pondered over what the future held for him. "London Heathrow" had the working title "Smashing Pumpkins" as the group felt it was reminiscent of the work of the band of the same name. Brown said that he had premonitions in the form of daydreams, one of which came to him while he was stuck at Heathrow Airport and inspired the song.

"Trenches" is about the over-glamorised touring lifestyle that someone can only comprehend when they have lived through it. "The Last American Virgin" takes its title from the film of the same name; the lyrics are also styled after the film as Wilson felt it was relevant to his personal life. The music for "Exit Summer" dates back to 2004–2005 Mutiny!-era demos and lyrically tackles internal conflict between the band members. Wilson found it hard to write the lyrics for "Unconditional", as he had received news about a person he grew up with having done something wrong and was unable to process it. "Product of the " had the working title "Cars" because it had a similar feel to the Cars' sound. Because it had a 1980s sound, Wilson decided to write about his childhood growing up the same era. The track includes references to various songs, shows, and movies from the decade: "Like a Virgin" (1984) by Madonna, Saved by the Bell (1989) and The Goonies (1985), among others.

While in the studio, band members were naming the tracks after Teenage Mutant Ninja Turtle references; Brown likening "Raphael" to the personality of the character of the same name. He said the lyrics served as "one long train of inner thought. First from confusion and fear, to want / need, to carelessness, and finally to remorse and forgiveness." A majority of "Illuminated Youth" was written while on the 2007 Paramore/the Starting Line tour. Brown called it an "invitation" for someone to leave their worries behind and become consumed in the "moments made possible by live music". "Not as Bad" talks about taking the plunge, breaking the rules and finding what works for the listener. The track lasts for nearly 19 minutes in total, however, 15 minutes of it is silent; a hidden track starts at the 18-minute mark featuring the sounds of cats and burping. "Calaveras" sounds out of place compared to the rest of the album. Wilson said the lyrics were about his former residence at 4100 Calaveras Drive, which he described as being "like the den of iniquity."

Release
In February and March 2011, the band supported Parkway Drive on their headlining tour of the US. On March 14, "Start the Reactor" was made available for streaming, and it was revealed that the group's new album, Burning at Both Ends, would be released later in the year. Following this, the group toured North American with August Burns Red in March and April. On May 4, Burning at Both Ends was announced for released in June, the track listing was revealed, and "Exit Summer" was made available for streaming. On May 20, "Certain" was released as a single, and was made available for streaming two days later. In May, the band went on a tour of the UK supporting Alkaline Trio, leading to a performance at Slam Dunk Festival. On June 8, a music video was premiered for "Certain" through Alternative Press; it was filmed the previous month in Santa Monica, California. It shows the band performing at a prom party, until halfway through when the crowd melts and merges into a monster that they fight off with music. Burning at Both Ends was made available for streaming on June 21, 2011, before being released on June 28, 2011 through Epitaph Records. "Calaveras" was included as a digital download bonus track and on the Japanese edition. The band donated a dollar for every copy sold in the first week of its release to breast cancer charity Keep A Breast Foundation.

Between June and August 2011, the group embarked for a stint on the Warped Tour. In late September and early October, the band toured Australia as part of the Soundwave Counter-Revolution festival. On October 5, a music video was premiered for "The Last American Virgin" through Alternative Press. In October and November, the band supported New Found Glory on their Pop Punk's Not Dead tour in the US. In December, the band went on a brief holiday tour with support from the Story So Far, This Time Next Year and the Sheds. They closed the year supporting Four Year Strong on their holiday tour dubbed It's a Wonderful Gig Life. In February 2012, the band played a few shows in Mexico and South America. Following appearances at the SXSW and South by So What?! festivals, the group embarked on a co-headlining US tour with Cartel. Mixtapes served as the main support act, while Hit the Lights and Fireworks appeared on select shows. In May, the group went on a UK tour alongside Make Do and Mend, Spycatcher, Hildamay and Evarose, leading to another appearance at Slam Dunk Festival. The group performed five shows in June as part of the Zumiez Couch Tour. "Product of the " was released as a single before the tour on June 4.

Reception

Burning at Both Ends peaked at number 165 on the Billboard 200. In addition, it charted on two Billboard component charts: number 27 on Independent Albums, and number 43 on Top Rock Albums. Dead Press! ranked the release at number seven on their top ten pop punk albums of the year list.

Burning at Both Ends received generally favorable reviews, according to review aggregator Metacritic. The Aquarian Weekly writer Giorgio Mustica highlighted "Start the Reactor" and "Trenches", praising Wilson and Brown's vocals on both tracks. He admitted that while he is normally not a fan of pop punk, he found the album "really ... exciting." Exclaim! reviewer Farah Barakat noted the slower tempo and focus on melodies; she spotlighted "Exit Summer" and "Certain" as faster tracks, finding the former "quickly fall[ing] short after the first verse" and the latter being "the strongest track" on the album.

Tim Newbound of Rock Sound wrote that the band was "back in irresistibly anthemic form", containing the "right blend of punk attitude and pop genius. With 'Burning At Both Ends', the Bay Area sextet have further underlined their second-to-none pop-punk pedigree." Chris Loomes of Dead Press! said it was "definitely a grower", with the band "storm[ing]" through the record "bursting with catchy hooks and thriving melodies." He singled out a number of pleasing vocal moments across the album, namely in "Certain" and "Exit Summer".

AllMusic reviewer Gregory Heaney complimented the band's "liberal use of infectious singalong choruses and half-time breakdowns", which are handled in a manner that is "precise without feeling restrained." Brian Shultz, in a review for Punknews.org, said overall that the group simply took the mid-tempo speed of "Summer Jam" (an earlier track of theirs), and then added "plenty of gloss across the board." He said the record's highlights "only manage to stand out marginally" over the standouts on their second album.

PopMatters Will Rausch wrote that while there were a few "solid" songs "and almost no terrible ones", a significant chunk of the album is simply "plain mediocre or leaves you with a feeling of musical blue balls." AbsolutePunk staff member Thomas Nassiff considered it a "downright embarrassment", adding that the sole major flaw it had was being "super boring." Critiquing it as a "blander, more watered-down version" of their previous album This Will Be the Death of Us, he felt the group's vocals were weak.

Track listing
All songs written by Set Your Goals and Brian McTernan, except "Calaveras" by Mikey Ambrose. All lyrics by Matt Wilson and Jordan Brown.

Personnel
Personnel per booklet.

Set Your Goals
 Matt Wilsonlead vocals
 Jordan Brownlead vocals, guitars
 Audelio Flores, Jr.guitars
 Daniel Coddaireguitars
 Joe Saucedobass guitar
 Mike Ambrosedrums

Additional musicians
 Kyle Blackadditional vocals (track 7)
 Jenn Brownadditional vocals (track 7), crew vocals
 Ryan Holdenadditional vocals (track 7), crew vocals
 Julioadditional vocals (track 7), crew vocals
 Matt Arcangeliadditional vocals (track 9), crew vocals
 Andrew Neufeldadditional vocals (track 12)
 Michael Bumbliscrew vocals
 Mike Galtcrew vocals
 Emilio Martinezcrew vocals
 Kevin O'Connellcrew vocals
 James Phillipscrew vocals
 Felicia Risolocrew vocals
 Brian Warnercrew vocals
 Set Your Goalscrew vocals

Production
 Brian McTernanproducer, engineer
 Paul Leavittassistance
 Mike Greensecondary producer, engineer
 Kyle Blackassistance, mixing (track 11)
 JR McNeelymixing (except track 11)
 Dave Collinsmastering
 Evan Leakeart, layout
 Juan Ramirezcover photographs

Charts

References

Set Your Goals (band) albums
2011 albums
Epitaph Records albums
Albums produced by Mike Green (record producer)
Albums produced by Brian McTernan